Iraqi Refugee Camp ( – Ārdūgāh Mohājrīn ʿArāqī) is a village and refugee camp in Anaqcheh Rural District, in the Central District of Ahvaz County, Khuzestan Province, Iran. At the 2006 census, its population was 1,276, in 194 families.

References 

Populated places in Ahvaz County
Refugee camps in Iran